Elseya uberrima is a Pliocene species of extinct Australian snapping turtle.

Taxonomy
During his time at the Queensland Museum, Charles Walter De Vis described a number of fossil turtles from the Darling Downs region of Queensland, Australia. All four species described were declared a single diagnosable species by Thomson, 2000.

To avoid confusion the synonymy for the species is as follows:

Elseya uberrima (De Vis, 1897)
Chelymys uberrima De Vis, 1897: 3
Chelymys antiqua De Vis 1897: 4
Chelymys arata De Vis 1897: 5
Pelocomastes ampla De Vis 1897: 6–7

This synonymy has made the genus name Pelocomastes a junior synonym of Elseya and in their recent revision of that genus Thomson et al. (2015) resurrected Pelocomastes as a subgenus to represent the Queensland clade of the Elseya. Therefore, Elseya (Pelocomastes) uberrima is the type species for this subgenus.

References

Elseya (Pelocomastes)
uberrima
Eocene turtles
Extinct turtles
Extinct animals of Australia
Turtles of Australia